Monitoring of a fetus may refer to:
Regular tests done as part of prenatal care during a pregnancy
Monitoring in childbirth